The America's Polo Cup was a polo event held annually in the United States of America from 2007 to 2010, but was declared bankrupt on September 13, 2010.   The event was organized by Tareq and Michaele Salahi, with varying degrees of support from sponsors.  Because the match was unsanctioned by the Federation of International Polo, it was largely considered a spectator event.  The event attracted controversy because  financial issues surrounding the event, including allegations of, nonpayment of vendors, charity funding issues, and sponsors' names and marks being used without their consent.

History

2007
On May 12, the United Kingdom defeated America 7-3 at Morven Park in Leesburg, Virginia.

2008
America defeated Italy 6-2 at Morven Park in Leesburg, Virginia.

2009
On May 9 America defeated Australia 4-2 at the Capitol Polo Club in Poolesville, Maryland.

2010
The 2010 America's Polo Cup match took place on June 12 on the National Mall in Washington, D.C., with teams announced as United States and India. The advertised ticket price for the event was $95 per person. The event had an attendance of about 250 people, with food from Popeyes Louisiana Kitchen. Reports of the event stated that the players who represented India were actually of Pakistani origin and were from Florida. A spokesman for the Embassy of India stated that neither the Embassy nor the government of India had any association with the event.

The event's website reportedly identified an Indian company, Kingfisher Beer, as a sponsor.  However, Kingfishers' chief executive denied that the company had sponsored the event.  Yashpal Singh, the president and chief executive of Mendocino Brewing Company, Kingfisher's parent company, reportedly stated, "We are not sponsoring this event and have informed the people managing this event of that, .... We have sent legal notices to this effect, and he keeps on advertising us as a sponsor. I don't know what world he's living in."

On September 13, 2010, the business "America's Polo Cup Inc." filed for Chapter 7 bankruptcy.

Controversy
Allegations of fraud over the past few years has caused a number of organizations to withdraw sponsorship. In 2009, Land Rover terminated its sponsorship after a  charity created by the Salahis was put under investigation by the Virginia Office of Consumer Affairs. The organization, Journey for the Cure, solicited donations of cash or auction items as part of their mission to support science grants and other funding for cures of multiple sclerosis and cancer but was never incorporated as a 501(c). In 2010, the Indian Embassy, Land Rover, Ritz Carlton, and the St. Regis Hotels terminated their sponsorship after the Sahali's White House gatecrashing incident.

References

External links
 America's Polo Cup Official Website

Fraud in the United States
Polo competitions in the United States
Sports trophies and awards
National Mall
Culture of Washington, D.C.
Annual sporting events in the United States